John Benstead may refer to:

 John de Benstede ( 1275–1323/4), member of the English royal household
 John Benstead (trade unionist) (1897–1979), English trade unionist